Cragia distigmata is a moth of the subfamily Arctiinae. It was described by George Hampson in 1901. It is found in the Democratic Republic of the Congo, Equatorial Guinea, Ghana, Kenya, Nigeria, South Africa, Tanzania, Togo and Uganda.

References

Moths described in 1901
Lithosiini
Moths of Africa